Elephantopin is a natural chemical compound extracted from the Elephantopus elatus plant of the genus Elephantopus, family Compositae. It is a sesquiterpene lactone with a germacranolide skeleton, containing two lactone rings and an epoxide functional group.

References

Epoxides
Sesquiterpene lactones
Oxygen heterocycles